Carl "Calle" Rosenblad (born 28 April 1969, in Västervik) is a Swedish auto racing driver. He is married with two children.

Racing career 
His first racing was in Swedish Formula Opel in 1990, where he drove for four seasons. He also drove in the Swedish Porsche Challenge and the  
European Interseries from 1991. In 1996 he got a drive in the International Formula 3000, with the British Alpha Plus Team. The season was not a successful one, ending with no championship points. In 1997 he switched to the FIA GT Championship, with a GT1 Class Porsche 911 for the Kremer Racing Team, again with little success.

He moved to touring cars in 1998, driving a Nissan Primera in the Swedish Touring Car Championship. In 1998 he also raced the Rolex 24h at Daytona for Larbre Compétition, ending in a strong 3rd place (total).

In 2002, he returned for another season in the FIA GT Championship in a Chrysler Viper GTS-R for Larbre Compétition.

He has competed regularly in the STCC since (some race wins), as well as selected rounds in both European Touring Car Championship and World Touring Car Championship during the years 2001 - 2007. In 2005 he first competed in the FIA World Touring Car Championship for Crawford Racing in an independent BMW 320i. He competed in four rounds of the WTCC in 2007 for Elgh Motorsport. Also in 2007 he competed in the 24 Hours of Le Mans, in a GT1 Ferrari F430 for G.P.C. Sport.

In 2009 he only participated in one race, the Spa 24 Hours driving a Maserati MC12 GT1 for Vitaphone Racing finishing in second place.

Racing record

Complete 24 Hours of Le Mans results

Complete World Touring Car Championship results
(key) (Races in bold indicate pole position) (Races in italics indicate fastest lap)

References

External links

1969 births
Living people
People from Västervik Municipality
Swedish racing drivers
Swedish Touring Car Championship drivers
Rolex Sports Car Series drivers
World Touring Car Championship drivers
FIA GT Championship drivers
24 Hours of Le Mans drivers
International Formula 3000 drivers
EFDA Nations Cup drivers
Blancpain Endurance Series drivers
24 Hours of Spa drivers
European Touring Car Championship drivers
European Touring Car Cup drivers
Sportspeople from Kalmar County
Larbre Compétition drivers